Route 77 is a state highway in the U.S. state of Rhode Island.

Route description
Route 77 starts at Rhode Island Road in southern Little Compton. It runs in a northerly direction and intersects Route 179. Continuing north past Route 177, Route 77 passes through downtown Tiverton. It continues north, directly paralleling the Sakonnet River, until it reaches its northern terminus at Route 24.

History
The section of Route 77 between Route 179 and Route 177 was part of Route 126 until May 1962, which now runs through the Blackstone Valley.

Major intersections

References

External links

2019 Highway Map, Rhode Island

077
Transportation in Newport County, Rhode Island
Tiverton, Rhode Island
Little Compton, Rhode Island